is a South Korean footballer who plays for Gangwon FC.

He formerly played for FC Tokyo from 2016 until 2019.

Club statistics
Updated to 25 February 2019.

Reserves performance

Last Updated: 25 February 2019

References

External links

Profile at FC Tokyo

1994 births
Living people
South Korean footballers
South Korean expatriate footballers
South Korean expatriate sportspeople in Japan
J1 League players
J2 League players
J3 League players
K League 1 players
K League 2 players
FC Tokyo players
FC Tokyo U-23 players
Avispa Fukuoka players
Seongnam FC players
Gangwon FC players
Association football midfielders